James Patrick Shelton (13 March 1897 – 15 July 1970) was an  Australian rules footballer who played with St Kilda in the Victorian Football League (VFL).

Shelton's son John Shelton played VFL football for Fitzroy.

Notes

Sources
 Hillier, K. (2004) Like Father Like Son, Pennon Publishing: Melbourne. .

External links 

1897 births
1970 deaths
Australian rules footballers from Victoria (Australia)
St Kilda Football Club players